The Astronaut Memorial  Planetarium and Observatory, or AMPO, also known as the Eastern Florida State College Planetarium and Observatory, is an astronomical observatory and planetarium  at Eastern Florida State College in Cocoa, Florida.  The facility consists of a planetarium, public observatory, large-screen movie theater, exhibit halls, multi-media classroom and an art gallery.

In September 2017 hurricane Irma caused minor damage to the building. It has been shut down since then.
"The EFSC Planetarium and Observatory on the Cocoa Campus is closed indefinitely because of damage caused by Hurricane Irma." As noted on its homepage
 retrieved 2020-07-05.
In April 2018 they announced an effort to raise $9M to repair and refurbish the planetarium and observatory.

Planetarium and observatory
The 210-seat planetarium theater is a 70-foot overhead hemisphere onto which images from a variety of projectors are shone, to simulate the night sky and to provide multimedia educational and entertainment programs to area schools and to the public.  On the rooftop public observatory, visitors can view planets, stars,  galaxies and other objects directly through a  Ritchey–Chrétien telescope operated by observatory staff and members of the Brevard Astronomical Society.

Other facilities
The observatory is also home to The Discovery Theater, Science Quest Exhibit Hall, and the International Hall of Space Explorers.  The Discovery Theater uses a 70 mm Iwerks movie projector to shown are science and nature films.  It also has an art gallery which images of space are shown, such as Messier 101.

See also
 List of astronomical observatories
 List of planetariums

References

External links
Eastern Florida State College Planetarium and Observatory

Astronomical observatories in Florida
Eastern Florida State College
Public observatories
Museums in Brevard County, Florida
Planetaria in the United States
Science museums in Florida